Austagram is an upazila of Kishoreganj District in the Division of Dhaka, Bangladesh.

Geography
It has 21,077 households and a total area of 355.53 km.

Demographics
According to the 1991 Bangladesh census, Austagram had a population of 132,303, of whom 59,377 were aged 18 or over. Males constituted 51.41% of the population, and females 48.59%. Austagram had an average literacy rate of 38.2% (7+ years), against the national average of 32.4%.

Administration
Austagram Upazila is divided into eight union parishads: Deoghar Union, Kastul Union, Austagram Sadar Union, Bangalpara Union, Kalma Union, Adampur Union, Khayerpur-Abdullapur Union and Purba Austagram Union. The union parishads are subdivided into 59 mauzas and 72 villages.

See also
 Upazilas of Bangladesh

References

All Astagram News

Upazilas of Kishoreganj District